Ericsson is a Swedish telecommunications equipment manufacturer.
 
Ericsson or Ericson may also refer to:

Companies
Ericson Yachts, a former builder of fiberglass yachts
Ericsson Mobile Platforms, a company providing cellular platforms technology
Sony Ericsson, a joint venture between Sony Corporation and Ericsson
LG-Ericsson, a joint venture between LG and Ericsson
Ericsson Hewlett Packard Telecom, a Swedish consortium

Places

United States
Ericsson, Minneapolis, Minnesota
Ericson, Nebraska

Other uses
Ericson Alexander Molano (born 1979), Colombian Gospel singer
Ericsson cycle, a thermodynamic cycle
Ericsson Open, a former name of the Miami Masters tennis tournament
USS Ericsson, warships in the United States Navy
Ericsson Globe, a sports arena in Stockholm named after the company Ericsson
Ericson (footballer), Brazilian footballer

See also
Ericsson (surname)
Eriksson, a common Swedish patronymic surname
Erickson (disambiguation)
Ericsson Stadium (disambiguation)